The Făgăraș Mountains are the highest mountains of the Southern Carpathians, in Romania.

Geography

The range is bordered in the north by the Făgăraș Depression, through which the Olt River flows, and in the west by the Olt Valley (Valea Oltului). Other important surrounding cities are Brașov and Sibiu.

Glacier lakes include Bâlea (2,034 m, 46,508 m2, 11.35 m deep), the largest. The highest lake is in the Hărtopul Leaotei glacial valley. The deepest glacial lake is Podragu (2,140 m, 28,550 m2; 15.5 m deep). Other lakes are Urlea (2,170 m, 20,150 m2) and Capra (2,230 m, 18,340 m2).

The highest peaks are:

Moldoveanu — 
Negoiu — 
Viștea Mare — 
Lespezi — 
 — 
Vânătoarea lui Buteanu — 
 — 
 — 
 — 2,495 m
 — 2,495 m
 — 2,494 m
 — 2,489 m
 — 2,485 m
 — 2,482 m
 — 2,473 m

Access and tourism

The most used access point to the mountains is the Transfăgărășan road. The Transfăgărășan runs across the Făgăraș range. It is generally open only between June and September, due to unfavorable weather conditions for the rest of the year.

The Făgăraș Mountains are a very popular hiking, trekking and skiing destination in Romania. Most people wanting to hike on the Moldoveanu leave from the town of Victoria, or, in other areas of the Făgăraș Mountains, from Arpașu de Jos, Porumbacu de Jos, and Avrig. In the vicinity of the Negoiu, and in the central part of the band take the rocky nature of the mountains, and reaching the main ridge trail there are technical difficulties and exposure. Somewhat difficult part of the trail is a "Three steps from the death" running the main ridge by ridge Custura Arpașului the lake (in Romanian Lacul) Capra (2,230 m). Also a bit challenging is one of the ways to Negoiu – Strunga Dracului. At the root of the fire is under Șerbota several meters of steel cable handrail, on the other part there are no artificial enhancements.

Conflicts
A decision to designate the mountains as a national park occurred in 2016, and has proven controversial with local people seeking to protect access to timber and forest products. In reality, the range has complex land tenure arrangements, so only a portion could be so designated initially, aided by private investment. There are also plans to develop a ski resort, opposed by conservationists but supported by many residents of the surrounding towns, who seek better livelihood and economic opportunities.

Image gallery

Notes

External links 
 Făgăraș Mountains: Trails, Webcam, Chalets, Cable car, Ski slopes, Transfăgărașan, Maps, Alpine Lakes Dam and Lake Vidraru
 Pictures and landscapes from the Fagaras Mountains 
Website about the Carpathian Mountains
SummitPost Page for Făgăraș
From Sâmbăta to Viștea refuge in winter
From Capra to Podragu and Moldoveanu peak in summer
Piscu Câinelui area in winter
Fereastra Zmeilor refuge in winter
Călțun and Scara in winter
Photos from 25+ trips in the Făgăraș range
 Salvamont Victoria 
 Făgăraș Interactive map

Mountain ranges of Romania
Mountain ranges of the Southern Carpathians